Mount Murray is a  mountain summit in the Spray Mountains range of the Canadian Rockies in Alberta, Canada. The mountain is situated in  Peter Lougheed Provincial Park of Kananaskis Country. Its nearest higher peak is Mount French,  to the south-southwest. Mount Murray can be seen from Alberta Highway 742, the Smith-Dorrien/Spray Trail.


History
The mountain was named in 1918 for General Sir A. J. Murray, (1860-1945). Murray was a British Army officer who served in the Second Boer War and the First World War as Commander-in-Chief of the Egyptian Expeditionary Force from 1916 to 1917.

The mountain's name was officially adopted in 1928 by the Geographical Names Board of Canada.

Geology
Mount Murray is composed of sedimentary rock laid down during the Precambrian to Jurassic periods. Formed in shallow seas, this sedimentary rock was pushed east and over the top of younger rock during the Laramide orogeny.

Climate
Based on the Köppen climate classification, Mount Murray is located in a subarctic climate with cold, snowy winters, and mild summers.

See also
Geography of Alberta

References

External links
 Mount Murray weather: Mountain Forecast
 Mount Murray climbing photos: Expor8ion.com

Three-thousanders of Alberta
Canadian Rockies
Alberta's Rockies